Kilbane is a surname. Notable people with the surname include:

James Kilbane (born 1970),  Irish Christian country, gospel and country singer
Johnny Kilbane (1889–1957), American boxer
Kevin Kilbane (born 1977), Irish footballer
Pat Kilbane (born 1969),  American actor, comedian and screenwriter
Sally Conway Kilbane (born 1942), American politician